, also known as , is a castle located in Ōzu, Ehime Prefecture, Japan. Early defensive structures date back to early 14th century by Utsunomiya Toyofusa. In 1888 deterioration of the castle  led to its demolition, but it was accurately re-constructed in 2004.

History 

The defensive compound as it stands today, however, was not erected until 1585–1617. Among them, renown castle designer Takatora is believed to have been the major contributor to the overall outline of the current structure.

In 1617, alighting from Yonago province, Katō Sadayasu took possession of the Ōzu domain. The Katō clan retained control of the domain during 13 generations, until the onset of the Meiji Restoration (1868).

During the Meiji era (1868–1912), abandoned and exposed to the mercy of inclement weather and natural hazards, the castle deteriorated rapidly. Threatening collapse, in 1888 it was decided to demolish the keep. Nonetheless, its two surrounding , Koran Yagura and Daidokoro Yagura, were left intact. These two elements, built in late Edo period (1603–1868), as well as the Owata and the Minami Sumi turrets were declared in 1957 Important Cultural Property by the Agency for Cultural Affairs of the Japanese Government.

Recent developments

In 2004, local citizens' & city officials' efforts culminated in the completion of a new keep at a cost of 1.6 billion JPY.

Old photographs, old maps and the discovery of an old model -depicting its original structure- permitted a faithful reconstruction. Only traditional assembling techniques and natural materials were employed. Historic accuracy was privileged to comfort and ease of construction. The project brought new life to ebbing carpenter and blacksmith craftsmanship.

At 19.15 m high, it stood as the tallest timber structure to have been erected since the enactment of the first post-war building regulations in 1950,  .

The castle is open to visitors. In a bid to revive the local economy through tourism overnight stays are also possible.

Images

See also 
Japan's Top 100 Castles

Further reading

References

External links 

 Ōzu Castle(official | EN)
 Ōzu Castle. Castle Stay (EN)
 Guide to Japanese Castles: Ōzu Castle 

Castles in Ehime Prefecture
Museums in Ehime Prefecture
History museums in Japan
Important Cultural Properties of Japan